An epispadias is a rare type of malformation in which the urethra ends, in males, in an opening on the upper aspect  of the penis, and in females when the urethra develops too far anteriorly. It occurs in around 1 in 120,000 male and 1 in 500,000 female births.

Signs and symptoms
Most cases involve a small and bifid penis, which requires surgical closure soon after birth, often including a reconstruction of the urethra. Where it is part of a larger exstrophy, not only the urethra but also the bladder (bladder exstrophy) or the entire perineum (cloacal exstrophy) are open and exposed on birth, requiring closure. Many parts of this article are incorrect.

Relationship to other conditions
Despite the similarity of name, an epispadias is not a type of hypospadias, and involves a problem with a different set of embryologic processes.

Women can also have this type of congenital malformation.  Epispadias of the female may occur when the urethra develops too far anteriorly, exiting in the clitoris or even more forward.  For females, this may not cause difficulty in urination but may cause problems with sexual satisfaction.  Frequently, the clitoris is bifurcated at the site of urethral exit, and therefore clitoral sensation is less intense during sexual intercourse due to frequent stimulation during urination.  However, with proper stimulation, using either manual or positional techniques, clitoral orgasm is definitely possible.

Causes
Epispadias is an uncommon and partial form of a spectrum of failures of abdominal and pelvic fusion in the first months of embryogenesis known as the exstrophy - epispadias complex. While epispadias is inherent in all cases of exstrophy it can also, much less frequently, appear in isolation as the least severe form of the complex spectrum. It occurs as a result of defective migration of the genital tubercle primordii to the cloacal membrane, and so malformation of the genital tubercle, at about the 5th week of gestation.

Treatment
The main treatment for isolated epispadias is a comprehensive surgical repair of the genito-urinary area usually during the first 7 years of life, including reconstruction of the urethra, closure of the penile shaft and mobilisation of the corpora. The most popular and successful technique is known as the modified Cantwell-Ransley approach. In recent decades however increasing success has been achieved with the complete penile disassembly technique despite its association with greater and more serious risk of damage.

Prognosis
Even with successful surgery, patients may have long-term problems with: 
 incontinence, where serious usually treated with some form of continent urinary diversion such as the Mitrofanoff
 depression and psycho-social complications
 sexual dysfunction

References

External links

Congenital disorders of urinary system
Congenital disorders of male genital organs
Rare diseases